Jacques Godbout, OC, CQ (born November 27, 1933) is a Canadian novelist, essayist, children's writer, journalist, filmmaker and poet. By his own admission a bit of a dabbler (touche-à-tout), Godbout has become one of the most important writers of his generation, with a major influence on post-1960 Quebec intellectual life.

Biography
Born in Montreal, Quebec, after studies at Collège Jean-de-Brébeuf and the Université de Montréal, Godbout taught French in Ethiopia before joining the National Film Board of Canada (NFB) as producer and scriptwriter in 1958.

He was active during Quebec's Quiet Revolution during which time he wrote a number of penetrating essays, the most important of which were collected in Le Réformiste (1975) and Le Murmure marchand (1984).

Godbout was a co-founder of Liberté (1959), the Mouvement laïque de la langue française (1962) and the Union des écrivains Québécois (1977). Godbout's films include four full-length features and more than 15 documentaries. He has also written nine novels for adults and two for children. Godbout currently writes a monthly column in the Quebec newsmagazine L'actualité.

Godbout lives in Outremont, a former city now in Montreal. He is the grand-nephew of former Quebec Premier Adélard Godbout.

Godbout's novel Une histoire américaine (1986) was chosen for inclusion in the French version of Canada Reads, broadcast on Radio-Canada in 2004, where it was championed by trade-union activist and professor Gérald Larose.

Awards and recognition
On June 30, 2016, Godbout was made an Officer of the Order of Canada by Governor General David Johnston for "his significant contributions to the literary arts and critical thinking for more than half a century."

His other awards and recognition include:

 Chevalier of the National Order of Quebec
 Ludger-Duvernay Prize (1973)
 Awarded the 2007 Prix Maurice Genevoix for La concierge du Panthéon
 Nominated for a 1997 Governor General's Award for children's literature for Une leçon de chasse
 Winner of the Quebec government's Prix Athanase-David in 1985
 Prix Belgique-Canada (1978)
 Winner of the 1967 Governor General's Award for Fiction for Salut Galarneau
'

Bibliography

Poetry
Carton pâte — 1956
Les pavés secs — 1958
C'est la chaude loi des hommes — 1960
La grande muraille de Chine — 1969
Souvenirs Shop — poèmes et proses — 1984

Fiction
L'aquarium — 1962
La couteau sur la table — 1965 (translated into English as The Knife on The Table)
Salut Galarneau! — 1967 (winner of the 1967 Governor General's Award for Fiction; translated into English as Hail Galarneau!)
D'amour P.Q. — 1972
L'isle au dragon — 1976 (translated into English as Dragon Island)
Les têtes à Papineau — 1981
Une histoire américaine — 1986
Le temps des Galarneau — 1993
Opération Rimbaud — 1999

Non-fiction
Le réformiste: textes tranquilles — 1975
Le murmure marchand — 1984
Abécédaire Québécois — 1988
L'écran du bonheur — 1990
L'écrivain de province: journal 1981–1990 — 1991
Le sort de l'Amérique — 1997

Children's literature
Une leçon de chasse — 1997 (nominated for a Governor General's Award)
Mes petites fesses — 1998

Filmography

Fiction
 YUL 871 - 1966
 Kid Sentiment - 1967
 IXE-13 - 1971
 The Swindle (La Gammick) - 1974

Documentaries
 À St-Henri le cinq septembre (narration)
 Les Administrateurs
 L'Affaire Norman William
 Aimez-vous les chiens?
 Alias Will James
 Anglo Blues
 Anne Hébert, 1916–2000
 Bientôt Noâl
 Les Canadiens
 Cinéma vérité : le moment décisif
 Comme en Californie
 Derrière l'image
 Deux épisodes dans la vie d'Hubert Aquin
 Les Dieux
 Distorsions
 L'École des peintres
 En dernier recours
 L'Extràme-Nord canadien
 Fabienne sans son Jules
 Feu l'objectivité
 Les héritiers du mouton noir
 Huit témoins
 L'Invasion (1775–1975)
 L'Invention du stress
 Jacques de Tonnancour, une interview
 Les Maîtres-sondeurs
 Marée au Ghana
 Le monde va nous prendre pour des sauvages
 The Black Sheep (Le Mouton noir)
 Paul-Émile Borduas (1905–1960)
 Les Petits Arpents
 Pour l'amour du stress
 Pour quelques arpents de neige
 Le Prospecteur et la Technique
 Quand vient l'été
 Québec Soft (La musique adoucit les moeurs)
 Rose et Landry
 Le Sort de l'Amérique
 Tàtes blanches
 Le Tir au fusil
 Traitor or Patriot (Traître ou Patriote)
 Travail d'équipe et Recherches agricoles
 Les "Troubbes" de Johnny
 Un monologue Nord-Sud
 Une Leçon de chasse
 Vivre sa ville
 Les Vrais Cousins

See also

List of Quebec writers
List of Quebec film directors
List of Quebec movies
Literature of Quebec
Culture of Quebec
Cinema of Quebec

References

External links
 
 Watch films by Jacques Godbout at NFB.ca
  Jacques Godbout fonds (R11744) at Library and Archives Canada
 Godbout, item at Athabasca University

1933 births
Living people
Canadian documentary film directors
Canadian male novelists
20th-century Canadian poets
20th-century Canadian male writers
Canadian male poets
20th-century Canadian novelists
Canadian poets in French
Governor General's Award-winning fiction writers
Journalists from Montreal
Knights of the National Order of Quebec
Writers from Montreal
Film directors from Montreal
National Film Board of Canada people
Officers of the Order of Canada
Prix Maurice Genevoix winners
Prix Athanase-David winners
Canadian novelists in French
Canadian male non-fiction writers